The Perpetrators are a Canadian rock / blues band formed in 1999 in Winnipeg, Manitoba, Canada.  The band was nominated for a 2006 Juno Award in the Blues Album of the Year category for The Gas and the Clutch.

History
Currently they are J "Howik" Nowicki (guitar, vocals), Ken "KMac" McMahon (drums, vocals) and John "Josco" Scoles (bass, vocals). Their best known songs include "Six Pack" and "She Lets Me Know". Past members include Ryan Menard, Scotty Hills, Chris "MAMA" Bauer, Chris Carmichael and Chris Saywell (also of the D.Rangers).

They have played back up for Hubert Sumlin, Louisiana Red, Paul "Wine" Jones, Downchild Blues Band, George "Wild Child" Butler, Jim Byrnes, Kenny Brown, and Cedric Burnside, as well as recording with Juno winners Sue Foley and Big Dave McLean.

The band was a 2006 Western Canadian Music Award recipient for Outstanding Blues Album.  The Perpetrators have also been nominated for a Juno and for Electric Act of the Year at the Toronto Blues Society's Ninth Annual Maple Blues Awards.

On January 25, 2007, The Perpetrators released a new single on Winnipeg radio stations titled "You're Gonna Kill Me" for their new album titled Tow Truck.  The album was released in April 2007 and was nominated for two 2008 Western Canadian Music Awards - best blues and best independent recordings. In the fall of 2008, their fourth album, recorded live at their home base, the High & Lonesome Club, was released just before they undertook their fourth European tour, with Scotty Hills behind the drumkit.

Nowicki currently performs regularly with Romi Mayes. McMahon and Menard perform with a variety of acts. The Perpetrators continue to play shows in and around Winnipeg, Manitoba, Canada and occasionally tour as the members' schedules permit.

Discography

Albums
 The Perpetrators (2003)
 The Gas and The Clutch (2005, WCMA Blues album of the year)
 Tow Truck (2007)
 Live at the High & Lonesome Club (2008)
 Stick Em Up (2013)

Compilations
 Winnipeg: The High & Lonesome Years, Vols I and III (2002 and 2004)
 Guess Who's Home - tribute to The Guess Who (2005)
 We Best Choose to Pick the Blues - tribute to Big Dave McLean (2005)

See also
List of bands from Canada

References

External links
Official Perpetrators web site
The Perpetrators Myspace page
The Perpetrators on Youtube
The Perpetrators' New Music Canada page

Musical groups established in 1999
Canadian blues rock musical groups
Musical groups from Winnipeg
1999 establishments in Manitoba